The Massachusetts Peace Society (1815–1828) was an anti-war organization in Boston, Massachusetts, established to "diffuse light on the subject of war, and to cultivate the principles and spirit of peace." Founding officers included Thomas Dawes, William Phillips, Elisha Ticknor, Thomas Wallcut and Noah Worcester. In 1828 the society "merged into the newly formed American Peace Society."

See also
 Pacifism in the United States

References

Further reading
 Noah Worcester. Correspondence between the Massachusetts Peace Society and the Emperor of Russia and Prince Gallitzin. Niles' Weekly Register, Oct. 18, 1817.
 Friend of Peace. v.2 (1821); v.4 (1827). Includes annual reports of the society.
 John Gallison. Address, delivered at the fourth anniversary of the Massachusetts peace society, Dec. 25, 1819. Cambridge: printed by Hilliard & Metcalf, 1820.
 Josiah Quincy. Address, delivered at the fourth anniversary of the Massachusetts peace society, Dec. 25, 1820. Cambridge: printed by Hilliard & Metcalf, 1821.
 Tyler Bigelow. Address, delivered at the eighth anniversary of the Massachusetts peace society, Dec. 25, 1823. Boston: Printed by John B. Russell, 1824.

External links
 Swarthmore College Peace Collection. Massachusetts Peace Society Records, 1816-1917.

Peace organizations based in the United States
1815 establishments in Massachusetts
1828 disestablishments
History of Boston
19th century in Boston